Kamal Guliyev (born 14 November 1976, Sumqayit) is a retired Azerbaijani international footballer.

Honours

Manager

Neftchala
Azerbaijan First Division (2): 2014–15, 2015–16

References

 
 
 

1976 births
Living people
Azerbaijani footballers
Azerbaijani expatriate footballers
Expatriate footballers in Ukraine
Azerbaijani expatriate sportspeople in Ukraine
FC Volyn Lutsk players
Ukrainian Premier League players
People from Sumgait
Association football midfielders
Azerbaijan international footballers